Vâlcea may refer to several places in Romania:

 Vâlcea County
 Vâlcea, a village in Bucium Commune, Alba County
 Vâlcea, a village in Șinca Commune, Brașov County